Eight teams, from 5 nations, are competing at the 2017 European Champions Cup.

Pool A

CNF Unipolsai Bologna

Manager  Daniele Frignani
Coaches Fabio Betto, Roberto Radaelli

Curaçao Neptunus

Manager  Ronald Jaarsma
Coaches Jan Collins, Eithel Martinus, Paul van den Oever

Mainz Athletics

Manager  Randy Ewart
Coaches Josh Little

Rouen Huskies

Manager  Keino Pérez
Coaches François Colombier, Gregory Fages

Pool B

A.S.D. Rimini

Manager  Paolo Ceccaroli
Coaches César Heredia, Pierpaolo Illuminati, Andrea Palumbo, Paolo Siroli

Buchbinder Legionäre

Manager  Kai Gronauer
Coaches Francis García, Jack Lind, Stefan Müller

L&D Amsterdam

Manager  Charlie Urbanus
Coaches Randell Hannah, Tjerk Smeets

T&A San Marino

Manager  Marco Nanni
Coaches Carlos Del Santo, Alberto Gallusi, Luca Spadoni

External links
Official CEB site
Results site

European Cup (baseball)